Lukas Wagner (born 19 November 2004) is a Danish footballer who plays as a centre-back for Danish Superliga club AC Horsens.

Career

Horsens
Wagner joined AC Horsens from Hatting/Torsted IF as a U-13 player. Already at the age of 15, Wagner made his unofficial debut for Horsens' first team in a friendly game against AaB in September 2020. At the age of 16, Wagner was promoted to the U-19 squad, where he became a regular starter for the team. He also continued to train with the first team squad during the second half of 2020–21 season.

16-year old Wagner got his official debut for Horsens on 24 May 2021 in a Danish Superliga game against OB. Wagner started on the bench, before replacing Bjarke Jacobsen for the last few minutes. This was his only first team appearance in the 2020–21 season.

In the 2021–22 season, Wagner continued to play for the U19s. However, he made two appearances for the first team in the first half of the season, both in the Danish Cup.

References

External links

Lukas Wagner at DBU

2004 births
Living people
Danish men's footballers
Association football defenders
Denmark youth international footballers
Danish Superliga players
Hatting/Torsted IF players
AC Horsens players